Joyful Noise is a chorus of 50 adults, ages 17–75, with physical or intellectual disabilities and acquired brain injuries. Founded in 2000 by director Allison Fromm and chorus member, Elizabeth Fromm, the ensemble is hosted by Bancroft, a support program for those with disabilities in southern New Jersey and Delaware. Joyful Noise's mission is to foster an atmosphere of community, acceptance, and teamwork in which members can discover their voices and express themselves through music. Cathy Sonnenberg and Rob Kennan serve as associate director and Delaware director.

The Joyful Noise Choral Series has been established as part of the chorus' vision to create new musical repertoire well suited to the spirit and the vocal and musical aptitudes of Joyful Noise and similar ensembles. To launch this series, a grant of $3,500 from the Philadelphia Eagles made possible the commissioning of new choral compositions by recognized choral composers Chester Alwes, James Bassi, Gerald Cohen, Edie Hill, Rob Kennan, Elliot Levine, J. David Moore, Nick Page, Alice Parker, Steven Sametz, and Jon Washburn. Ron Jeffers, editor of Earthsongs Publications, printed the first of these pieces for Joyful Noise's appearances at regional and national conferences of the American Choral Directors Association and Chorus America in 2008, 2009, and 2011.

As a result of Joyful Noise's performance at the American Choral Directors Association's 2011 National Conference in Chicago, conductors in several states are developing similar ensembles for singers with disabilities.  In 2012, Joyful Noise performed at the Yale International Choral Festival. In April 2014, Joyful Noise had a weekend residency at Harvard University with members of the Harvard-Radcliffe Collegium Musicum. In February 2016, Tim Sharp, ACDA Executive Director noted the direct influence Joyful Noise Chorus had on the new direction the ACDA will be heading with their "Innovation-In-Action" restructuring.

Performance Highlights

2011-Present 
December 22, 2015 PHILADELPHIA '76ers BASKETBALL GAME AT WELLS FARGO ARENA
November 8, 2014 JOYFUL NOISE RECRUITED FOR AMERICA'S GOT TALENT AUDITION
April 10, 2014 JOYFUL NOISE WEEKEND RESIDENCY AT HARVARD UNIVERSITY WITH ALICE PARKER
February 6, 2014 CHORAL CONNECTIONS WITH HARVARD RADCLIFFE COLLEGUIM MUSICUM
July 4, 2013 INDEPENDENCE DAY CELEBRATION HONORING BERNIE KING
January 21, 2013 POWER OF VOICES HONORING DR, MARTIN LUTHER KING JR. DELAWARE CHILDREN'S MUSEUM 
October 27, 2012 HOLIDAZZLE: LOVE AND LYRICS BENEFIT FOR DFRC AT THE GRAND OPERA HOUSE WILMINGTON, DE 
June 21, 2012 JOYFUL NOISE WORKS TO "TRANSFORM OUR WORLD" AT YICF YALE UNIVERSITY NEW HAVEN, CT 
April 12, 2012 JOYFUL NOISE "MISSION TO INSPIRE" MAKES NATIONAL IMPACT
March 20, 2012 PERFORMED NATIONAL ANTHEM AT SUN CENTER FOR THE HARLEM GLOBETROTTERS
February 18, 2012 BUILDING COMMUNITIES FESTIVAL CHOIR ACDA EASTER DIVISION CONFERENCE PROVIDENCE, RI
August 11, 2011 JOYFUL NOISE CHORUS ADDS THIRTEEN NEW MEMBERS
March 12, 2011 AMERICAN CHORAL DIRECTORS ASSOCIATION, NATIONAL CONFERENCE INTEREST SESSION WITH ALICE PARKER 
March 11, 2011 CARIBBEAN REEF CONCERT (SHEDD AQUARIUM, CHICAGO, IL)
January 20, 2011 FOR ONCE IN MY LIFE CONCERT & FILM SCREENING (WHYY STUDIO, PHILADELPHIA, PA)

2006-2010 
October 22, 2010 BANCROFT BUTTERFLY BALL (The Westin, Mount Laurel, NJ)
June 29, 2010  10TH ANNIVERSARY GALA: SINGING FROM THE HEART CHORAL FESTIVAL led by Nick Page (Katz Jewish Community Center, Cherry Hill, NJ)
March 20, 2010 VOICES OF PHILADELPHIA: ONE FAMILY, hosted by Singing City with Chester Children's Chorus & Northeast High (Church of the Holy Trinity, Philadelphia, PA)
June 11, 2009 CHORUS AMERICA ANNUAL CONFERENCE, Commissioning for the 'Exceptional' Chorus with Edie Hill, Alice Parker & Steven Sametz (Penn's Landing, Philadelphia, PA)
April 30, 2011 AUTISM AWARENESS MEETING, National Anthem for New Jersey Governor Jon Corzine (The Center for Neurological and Neurodevelopmental Health, Voorhees, NJ)
 February 1, 2009 CELEBRATING BANCROFT IN DELAWARE: BANCROFT’S 125TH ANNIVERSARY SONGBOOK (St. Paul’s Methodist Church, Wilmington, DE)
December 6, 2008 SONGS OF THE SEASON with ChildrenSong of New Jersey (Garden State Discovery Museum Cherry Hill, NJ)
May 30, 2008 AMERICAN CANCER SOCIETY RELAY FOR LIFE (Delran High School, Delran, NJ)
April 24, 2008 HARMONY AND HOPE with choruses from The Wardlaw-Hartridge School (Crescent Avenue Presbyterian Church, Plainfield, NJ)
February 16, 2008 MISSION TO INSPIRE CONCERT & SING-ALONG (St. Patrick-St. Anthony Church, Hartford, CT)
February 16, 2008 AMERICAN CHORAL DIRECTORS ASSOCIATION INTEREST SESSION with Alice Parker (Hartford Marriott, Hartford, CT)
December 11, 2007  HOLIDAY CONCERT with Kardon Chorale (Voorhees Town Center, Voorhees, NJ)
September 7, 2008 NATIONAL ANTHEM FOR CAMDEN RIVERSHARKS (Campbell's Field, Camden, NJ)
June 24, 2006 OLD TIME ROCK ‘N ROLL (Markeim Art Center, Haddonfield, NJ)

2000-2005 
June 25, 2005 SINGING FOR CHILDREN (Garden State Discovery Museum, Cherry Hill, NJ)
June 26, 2004 MELODIOUS MEMORIES with Alice Parker(First Baptist Church, Haddonfield, NJ)
June 13, 2004 CHILDREN IN SONG (The Children’s Hospital of Philadelphia, Philadelphia, PA)
November 3, 2003 THE POWER OF MUSIC PRESENTATION (St. Mary’s College, South Bend, IN)
June 21, 2003 JOYFUL WINDS OF SONG with The Western Wind (First Baptist Church, Haddonfield, NJ)
June 5, 2003 CHORUS AMERICA ANNUAL CONFERENCE, “The Power of Music” Presentation (Kansas City, MO)
February 3, 2003 NEW JERSEY MUSIC EDUCATORS’ CONFERENCE (New Brunswick, NJ)
July 4, 2002 INDEPENDENCE DAY SING-ALONG (Kresson View Center, Voorhees, NJ)
April 13, 2002  JOYFUL HARMONY: A FESTIVAL OF SONG with Harmonium Choral Society (First Baptist Church, Haddonfield, NJ)
December 9, 2001 SHARE THE JOY! with First Baptist Church Choir & Orchestra (First Baptist Church, Haddonfield, NJ)
September 16, 2000 NEWTON COUNTY ARTS FESTIVAL (Haddonfield, NJ)

References

External links 
Joyful Noise official site
ChoralNet: Friends of Joyful Noise
Joyful Noise Facebook page

Choirs in New Jersey
Musical groups established in 2000
Choirs in Delaware